Arena Sever is a multi-use arena in Krasnoyarsk, Russia. The arena was opened in 2011 and it is mainly used for ice hockey and basketball games. It is the home arena of the basketball team BC Enisey and of the ice hockey team Sokol Krasnoyarsk.

References

External links
Official website 

Music venues in Russia
Sports venues in Russia
Indoor arenas in Russia
Indoor ice hockey venues in Russia
Buildings and structures in Krasnoyarsk Krai
Sport in Krasnoyarsk
Sokol Krasnoyarsk